Mauro Favilla (5 January 1934 – 16 March 2021) was an Italian politician.

He served as Senator (1987–1996) and Mayor of Lucca for five terms (1972–1984, 1988, 2007–2012).

He died of COVID-19.

References

1934 births
2021 deaths
Mayors of Lucca
Politicians from Lucca
Christian Democracy (Italy) politicians
Forza Italia politicians
The People of Freedom politicians
Senators of Legislature X of Italy
Senators of Legislature XI of Italy
Senators of Legislature XII of Italy
20th-century Italian politicians
21st-century Italian politicians
Deaths from the COVID-19 pandemic in Tuscany